RTBF International was the Belgian (Wallonia) and (Brussels) international radio station owned by RTBF, available in Europe and Central Africa via satellite and online.

History
On 26 June 2006, RTBF International began broadcasting in FM in Kinshasa on 99.2 MHz.

RTBF ceased its shortwave service on 31 December 2009. Around July 2019, the radio station seemed to have ceased operations. In Belgium though DAB+ and internet RTBF Mix has been launched for the north of the country.

Although RTBF ceased its international service, it continues broadcasting from the Wavre transmitter on 621 kHz, everyday from 05:00–23:00, in AM with La Première broadcasting from 05:00–19:00, 23:00–00:00 (Monday to Friday), 06:00–14:00 (Weekends), and VivaCité broadcasting the rest of the time. It has been announced that this Medium Wave service shall cease before the end of 2018.

See also
RTBF
La Première
VivaCité

References

External links
www.rtbfi.be

2004 establishments in Belgium
International broadcasters
Radio stations established in 2004
French-language radio stations in Belgium
Radio stations disestablished in 2019 
2019 disestablishments in Belgium
Defunct mass media in Belgium